Annette Becker (1953) is a French historian specializing in study of World War I. She is daughter of the historian Jean-Jacques Becker.

Works 
14-18
 Collab. with Stéphane Audoin-Rouzeau, La Grande Guerre : 1914-1918, Paris, Gallimard, coll. "Découvertes Gallimard" (nº 357), 1998.

References

External links
Hansong Li, "Conscience, Violence and History: Interview with Annette Becker"

1953 births
Place of birth missing (living people)
20th-century French historians
Living people
French women historians
Officiers of the Légion d'honneur
Officers of the Ordre national du Mérite
21st-century French historians